Tetratheca decora, also known as black-eyed susan, is a species of plant in the quandong family that is endemic to Australia.

Description
The species grows as a small, erect shrub to 30–40 cm in height. The deep lilac-pink flowers have petals 6–15 mm long, appearing mainly from September to November.

Distribution and habitat
The plants have a scattered distribution across central eastern New South Wales from the Warrumbungles to the Nowra area, occurring in heath and dry sclerophyll forest on sandstone substrates.

References

decora
Flora of New South Wales
Oxalidales of Australia
Taxa named by Joy Thompson
Plants described in 1976